

Qualification rules

A nation may earn up to 1 boat in each of the 14 Rowing events.

Note that though crew members' names are given below, for boats which qualified at the 2007 World Championships the crew racing at the Olympics is not required to include the same crew members as the crew which qualified.

Summary

Qualification timeline

* Open to NOCs that are members of Organización Deportiva Panamericana, with the exception of USA and Canada.

** Open to all NOCs except in the M1x, LM2x, W1x and LW2x events where the NOCs from Africa, Asia and Latin America are excluded.

Single Sculls Men

Pairs Men

Double Sculls Men

Fours Men

Quadruple Sculls Men

Eights Men

Double Sculls Lightweight Men

Fours Lightweight Men

Single sculls women

Pairs Women

Double Sculls Women

Quadruple Sculls Women

Eights Women

Double Sculls Lightweight Women

* Nation invited via Unused Quota Places.

References

 Olympic Qualification Summary

Qualification for the 2008 Summer Olympics